Morriston railway station served the community of Morriston, Swansea, Wales from 1881 to 1965 on the Morriston Branch.

History 
The station opened on 9 May 1881 by the Great Western Railway. The station was situated south of Clase Road on the A48. The station's name was changed to Morriston West in January 1950 to avoid confusion with another Morriston station. The station closed to passengers on 11 June 1956 and completely on 4 October 1965. No trace of the station remains and the site is lost under the A4067 Neath Road.

References 

Disused railway stations in Swansea
Former Great Western Railway stations
Railway stations in Great Britain opened in 1881
Railway stations in Great Britain closed in 1956
1881 establishments in Wales
1965 disestablishments in Wales